The Sherbrooke Canadiens were a professional ice hockey team in Sherbrooke, Quebec, Canada. They played their home games at the Palais des Sports. They were a member of the American Hockey League from 1984 to 1990, and were a farm team of the Montreal Canadiens.  

The team had been the Nova Scotia Voyageurs before 1984, and subsequently moved to Fredericton, New Brunswick as the Fredericton Canadiens. 

The team won the Calder Cup in 1985, beating the Baltimore Skipjacks in six games behind the goaltending of a young Patrick Roy.

Regular season

Playoffs

 
Montreal Canadiens minor league affiliates
Winnipeg Jets minor league affiliates
Ice hockey clubs established in 1984
Ice hockey clubs disestablished in 1990
Sport in Sherbrooke
1984 establishments in Quebec
1990 disestablishments in Quebec